Baron Hans Heinrich "Dickie" von Trauttenberg (January 6, 1909 - October 25, 1985) was a German-born Austrian ice hockey player who competed for the Austrian national team at the 1936 Winter Olympics in Garmisch-Partenkirchen.

Playing career
Trauttenberg studied at Cambridge University and played for their hockey team during the 1930s, captaining the team in 1931.

One of the top defensemen in Austria at the time, he made 25 appearances for the national team at the World Championships between 1930 and 1935.

In what would be his final international tournament, Trauttenberg captained the Austrian national team at the 1936 Winter Olympics. He was residing in London at the time and played his club hockey with Streatham of the English National League.

References

1909 births
1985 deaths
Austrian ice hockey defencemen
Ice hockey players at the 1936 Winter Olympics
Olympic ice hockey players of Austria
German emigrants to Austria